Philoplitis is a genus of braconid wasps in the family Braconidae. There are about nine described species in Philoplitis, found in Africa and Indomalaya.

Species
These nine species belong to the genus Philoplitis:
 Philoplitis adustipalpus Ahmad, 2005
 Philoplitis coniferens Nixon, 1965
 Philoplitis dzangasangha Fernandez-Triana & Ranjith, 2019
 Philoplitis keralensis Ranjith & Fernandez-Triana, 2019
 Philoplitis margalla Fernandez-Triana & Ranjith, 2019
 Philoplitis masneri Fernández-Triana & Goulet, 2009
 Philoplitis punctatus Fernández-Triana & Goulet, 2009
 Philoplitis striatus Fernández-Triana & Goulet, 2009
 Philoplitis trifoveatus Ranjith & Fernandez-Triana, 2019

References

Further reading

 
 
 

Microgastrinae